Ousmane Sanou (born 11 March 1978) is a Burkinabé former professional footballer who played as a striker.

Club career
Sanou was born in Bobo Dioulasso, Burkina Faso. He made his debut in professional football for Willem II, on 28 August 1996 replacing Geoffrey Prommayon in the second half against RKC Waalwijk.

International career
He was part of the Burkina Faso national team's 2000 African Nations Cup team which finished bottom of group C in the first round of competition, thus failing to secure qualification for the quarter-finals.

External links
 
 
 Profile
 Profile II

1978 births
Living people
People from Bobo-Dioulasso
Burkinabé footballers
Association football forwards
Burkina Faso international footballers
Eredivisie players
Eerste Divisie players
RC Bobo Dioulasso players
Willem II (football club) players
Sparta Rotterdam players
FC Eindhoven players
Kozakken Boys players
KFC Turnhout players
K. Berchem Sport players
TOP Oss players
VV UNA players
1996 African Cup of Nations players
1998 African Cup of Nations players
2000 African Cup of Nations players
21st-century Burkinabé people
Burkinabé expatriate footballers
Burkinabé expatriate sportspeople in the Netherlands
Expatriate footballers in the Netherlands
Burkinabé expatriate sportspeople in Belgium
Expatriate footballers in Belgium